Gayism is a slang (and often derogatory) term that may refer to:

 Homophobia (cognate with terms such as racism and sexism)
 Homosexuality
 LGBT social movements (referred to by opponents as "gayism" or "gay ideology")